Glenn v. Brumby et al., 724 F. Supp. 2d 1284 (N.D. Ga. 2010), aff'd, 663 F.3d 1312 (11th Cir. 2011), is an American federal court case relating to the rights of transgender people. The case involved Vandy Beth Glenn, a transgender woman living in Georgia, who was dismissed from her job as a legislative editor at the Georgia General Assembly in 2007 on informing her supervisor, Sewell Brumby, of her transgender status.

The lawsuit claimed that the state's action violated the provisions of the Equal Protection Clause against sex-based discrimination.

Glenn prevailed in the United States District Court; the district court's judgment was upheld on appeal.

See also 
 Price Waterhouse v. Hopkins

References

External links 
 Lambda Legal: Glenn v. Brumby et. al.
 Justia: Glenn v. Brumby
 Findlaw.com: Glenn v. Brumby
 uscourts.gov: Glenn v. Brumby: ruling by the Court of Appeals of the Eleventh Circuit
 practicallaw.com: Discrimination Against Transgender Individuals is Sex Discrimination: Eleventh Circuit

United States Court of Appeals for the Eleventh Circuit cases
United States employment discrimination case law
2011 in United States case law
United States transgender rights case law
Women's rights in the United States
Discrimination against transgender people
United States gender discrimination case law
History of women in Georgia (U.S. state)
2011 in LGBT history
LGBT in Georgia (U.S. state)